Jack Tate may refer to:

Jack Tate, who portrays Jack in the Box mascot, Jack Box
Jack Tate (actor) in Warriors of Virtue
Jack Tate Center for Entrepreneurship
Jack Tate (politician), a Member of the Colorado State Senate

See also
Jack Tait (disambiguation)
John Tate (disambiguation)